Slobodan "Braco" Dimitrijević (born 18 June 1948) is a Bosnian conceptual artist. His works deal mainly with history and the individual's place in it. He lives and works in Paris, France.

He has exhibited internationally since the 1970s, including at the Tate Gallery in 1985. He has participated in documenta (1972, 1977 and 1992) and the Venice Biennale (1976, 1982, 1990, 1993 and 2009). His works are held in the collection of the Tate Gallery, MoMA Museum of Modern Art New York, and that of the Centre Pompidou, among others.

Early life & work

Braco Dimitrijević was born on 18 June 1948 in Sarajevo, Bosnia and Herzegovina, FPR Yugoslavia. His father was the painter Vojo Dimitrijević, one of the most famous modern artists in Yugoslavia. He started painting at the age of 5 and was featured in a TV show entitled Filmske Novosti (Film News) in 1957. His first conceptual work dates back to 1963.

He went on to study at Academy of Fine Arts in Zagreb, from which he graduated in 1971. He then studied at Saint Martin's School of Art in London from 1971 to 1973.

In 1976, he wrote Tractatus Post Historicus, which formed the theoretical basis of his early work.

Casual Passers-by

In the 1970s, Dimitrijevic gained attention when he began his Casual Passer-by series. The work features very big close-up photographic portraits of everyday people that were hung on buildings and billboard in different cities in Europe and America. He then went on to produce memorial plaques in honour of other people that he met. About the one he made for the Lucio Amelio's "Terrae Motus" collection he said: "I Stopped the first man i saw in the street, explained to him what my work was and then asked him to be the model for the foto".

Animals

His work from the 1980s which joined animals and works of art would go on to become an exhibition in 1998 at the Paris Zoo that was visited by over a million people.

New work

His Triptychos Post Historicus installations feature paintings by old or modern masters in conjunction with everyday objects and fruits/vegetables. More than 500 of these installations exist. Controversy arose when a man who visited the exhibition at the Tate realized that the paintings in question were not copies but the originals and reported this to The Times who then wrote about it.

Exhibitions

 2017: Braco Dimitrijević. Retrospektiva, Museum of Contemporary Art, Zagreb, Croatia
 2016: Braco Dimitrijević: Retrospective, GAM – Galleria Civica d’Arte Moderna e Contemporanea, Turin, Italy
 2016: Braco Dimitrijević – My Berlin Years, Daniel Marzona, Berlin, Germany
 2014: Early London Years 1971 – 1979, MOT International, London, UK
 2013: Braco Dimitrijević, National Art Gallery Sofia, Sofia, Bulgaria
 2012: Sailing to Post-History, Latvian National Museum of Arts, Riga, Latvia
 2011: Louvre is my Studio, Street is my Museum, White Box, New York, USA
 2011: Braco Dimitrijević, Musée National d’Histoire et d’Art, Luxembourg City, Luxembourg
 2009: Future Post History, Collateral Event 53rd Venice Biennial, Ca’ Pesaro, Galleria Internazionale d’Arte Moderna, Venice, Italy
 2009: Louvre is my studio, street is my museum, Musée d’Art moderne de Saint-Etienne, Saint-Etienne, France
 2008: Braco Dimitrijević: Retrospective Exhibition, Ludwig Museum – Museum of Contemporary Art, Budapest, Hungary
 2008: Louvre is my Studio, Street is my Museum, National Museum of Contemporary Art (MNAC), Bucharest, Romania
 2005: Triptychos Post Historicus, Musée d’Orsay, Paris, France
 2005: Braco Dimitrijević, State Russian Museum, St. Petersburg, Russia
 2005: Braco Dimitrijević, Mudima – Fondazione per l´Art Contemporanea, Milan, Italy
 2004: Braco Dimitrijević, Museum of Modern Art Dubrovnik, Dubrovnik, Croatia
 2000:Triptychos Post Historicus, Pori Taidemuseo / Pori Art Museum, Pori, Finland
 1996: Braco Dimitrijević, Kunsthalle Düsseldorf, Düsseldorf, Germany
 1995: Braco Dimitrijević: against historic sense of gravity, Hessisches Landesmuseum Darmstadt, Darmstadt, Germany
 1994: Braco Dimitrijević: slow as light, fast as thought, Museum Moderner Kunst Stiftung Ludwig, Vienna, Austria
 1987: Braco Dimitrijević – für Malewitsch, Mondrian, Einstein, Wilhelm Hack Museum, Ludwigshafen, Germany
 1987: Triptichos Post Historicus, Le Consortium, Dijon, France
 1984: Culturescapes. 1976 – 1984, Kunstmuseum Bern, Bern, Switzerland / Museum Ludwig, Cologne, Germany
 1979: Photographs and Installations, Institute of Contemporary Arts, London, UK
 1975: Braco Dimitrijevic, Städtisches Museum Abteiberg, Mönchengladbach, Federal Republic of Germany
 1974: Braco Dimitrijevic, Museum of Contemporary Art Zagreb, Zagreb, former Yugoslavia

See also
 List of painters from Bosnia and Herzegovina

References

External links 
 Braco Dimitrijević
 Galerie TORRI
 artfacts entry
  Louvre is my studio, street is my museum 

1948 births
Yugoslav expatriates in France
Living people
Contemporary artists
Yugoslav artists
Artists from Sarajevo
Alumni of Saint Martin's School of Art
Bosnia and Herzegovina painters
21st-century Bosnia and Herzegovina artists